Marie-Louise Potter (born March 15, 1959) is a Seychellois politician and diplomat member of the National Assembly of Seychelles.  She is a member of the Seychelles People's Progressive Front, and was first elected to the Assembly in 1993.  In 2007 she became the leader of Government Business.
Potter was appointed in March 2012 as the Permanent Representative of Seychelles to the United Nations, on June 9, 2012 as the Seychellense Ambassador to the United States, High commissioner (Commonwealth) to Ottawa and on 1 November 2016 as Foreign Secretary, and retired from these posts on 1 March 2017.

References

Member page on Assembly website

1959 births
Living people
Members of the National Assembly (Seychelles)
People from Beau Vallon, Seychelles
United Seychelles Party politicians
Seychellois women in politics
21st-century women politicians
20th-century women politicians
Permanent Representatives of Seychelles to the United Nations
Seychellois women diplomats
Women ambassadors